Frank Smith (3 May 1888 – 3 July 1948) was an Australian politician who represented the South Australian House of Assembly seat of Glenelg from 1941 to 1947 for the Liberal and Country League.

References

 

Members of the South Australian House of Assembly
Liberal and Country League politicians
1888 births
1948 deaths
20th-century Australian politicians